Windsor station is a train station in Windsor, Ontario, Canada. It is the western terminus of Via Rail's Quebec City–Windsor Corridor. It is located in the Walkerville neighbourhood adjacent to the Hiram Walker distillery, near the Detroit River.  During the week, it is served by eight Via Rail train trips per day, of which 4 originate in Windsor and 4 return to Windsor from Toronto (3 each way on Sundays). In 2012, Windsor was listed as the seventh busiest station in the country, according to Via.

History

The original station was built by the Grand Trunk Railway in 1884 on the waterfront north of Sandwich Street East (Riverside Drive East) at the foot of Goyeau Street. The station was closed in 1961 when service was relocated to the station's present location in Walkerville. The site of the first station is now the location of Riverfront Park and near where Spirit of Windsor Canadian National # 5588 now sits.

The New York Central's train to Toronto and Montreal and Wolverine, as well as Amtrak's Niagara Rainbow train crossed the Detroit River by way of the Michigan Central Railway Tunnel but did not use this station. Instead, they used the Windsor Michigan Central Railroad Depot on the line leased from Canada Southern Railway until 1979 when service ceased. The station, which had been built in 1911, was destroyed by fire in 1996.

On November 8, 2010, Via Rail unveiled the design for a new station building to replace the previous structure built in the 1960s. The new building was completed in September 2012 at a cost of C$5.3 million. The station was officially opened on November 16, 2012, with Stephen Fletcher from the Government of Canada and Yves Desjardins-Sciliano from VIA Rail present.

References

External links

Buildings and structures in Windsor, Ontario
Via Rail stations in Ontario
Rail transport in Windsor, Ontario
1961 establishments in Ontario
Railway stations in Canada opened in 1961
Railway stations in Essex County, Ontario